The Hutchinson Building is a landmark building located in downtown Saskatoon, Saskatchewan, Canada.  The building was designed by architect Frank P. Martin built to house the Saskatoon Hardware Store Ltd until 1970 then the building was taken over by Saskatoon Handicraft Supplies until 1995. The building was designated a heritage property on August 9, 1999. 

The studios of the CBC Television station CBKST were located in the building prior to the station's shutdown in 2012.

References

External links

Buildings and structures in Saskatoon
Buildings and structures completed in 1923
Canadian Broadcasting Corporation buildings
1923 establishments in Saskatchewan